Ninacaca (from Quechua Nina Qaqa, meaning "fire rock") is one of thirteen districts of the Pasco Province in Peru.

Geography 
Other mountains are listed below:

References